Sotwara is a village situated in the Jhunjhunu district, state of Rajasthan, Western India. It is 21 km away from Jhunjhunu and almost 14 km from Nawalgarh, and also 4 km away from Sikar-Loharu State Highway-8, which is one of the best transportation way between Sikar-Jhunjhunu-Loharu.

It has nearly 2500 houses and has its own Gram Panchayat (Local Self Governing Body) which has  Nawalgarh, Rajasthan as its Tehsil.

Language
Basically Rajasthani Marwari is more popular here but Hindi also has the same respect.

Near By Villages
Dumra ( 3 km ), Mandasi ( 3 km ), Jejusar ( 5 km ), Kairu ( 5 km ), Kumawas ( 7 km ) are the nearby Villages to Sotwara.
deogaon 5 km

Education
This village has around 3 primary schools for kids and a Government Senior Secondary school for high schooling which has Science and Arts streams for high education. And, there are also two private institutions for the same. Many students from outside of the village come here to get better education.

Pin Code
Pin code for this village is 333707 .

References

External links 
 http://www.indiamapia.com/Jhunjhunu/Sotwara.html
 http://jhunjhunu.info/villages/?cat=276

Villages in Jhunjhunu district